The 1935 FIBA European Championship, commonly called EuroBasket 1935, was the first FIBA EuroBasket regional basketball championship, held by FIBA, as well as a test event preceding the first Olympic basketball tournament at the 1936 Summer Olympics.  Ten national teams affiliated with the International Basketball Federation (FIBA) took part in the competition.  The event was hosted by Switzerland and held in Geneva in May, 1935.

The 2012 Latvian film Dream Team 1935 is based on the events of the tournament. It tells the story of the Latvian national basketball team, the winners of the tournament.

Preliminary round
Before the tournament began, a qualification game was played between Spain and Portugal.  The game was held in Madrid, Spain and refereed by Spanish coach Mariano Manent.  Spain won, 33–12.
{{basketballbox
 | bg         = 
 | date       = 15 April 1935
 | time       = 
 | report     = 
 | teamA      =  | scoreA     = 33 | teamB      = 
 | scoreB     = 12
 | overtime   =
 |H1          = 16–6
 |H2          = 17–6
 | OT         = 
 | points1    = 
 | rebounds1  = 
 | assist1    = 
 | otherstat1 = 
 | points2    = 
 | rebounds2  = 
 | assist2    = 
 | otherstat2 =
 | duration   =
 | place      = Madrid
 | attendance = 
 | referee    = 
 | TV         = 
 | series     = 
}}

Results
Classification round
The classification round served to place the six teams eliminated in the preliminary round into places 5 through 10.

5th–10th place quarterfinals

5th–8th place semifinals

Ninth place match

Seventh place match

Fifth place match

Final round

Round of 16

Quarterfinals

Semifinals 

Bronze medal match

Final

Final standings

Team rosters
 Latvia: Eduards Andersons, Aleksejs Anufrijevs, Mārtiņš Grundmanis, Herberts Gubiņš, Rūdolfs Jurciņš, Jānis Lidmanis, Džems Raudziņš, Visvaldis Melderis (Coach: Valdemārs Baumanis)
 Spain:  Rafael Martín, Emilio Alonso, Pedro Alonso, Juan Carbonell, Armando Maunier, Fernando Muscat, Cayetano Ortega, Rafael Ruano (Coach: Mariano Manent)
 Czechoslovakia:  Jiří Čtyřoký, Jan Fertek, Josef Franc, Josef Klima, Josef Moc, František Picek, Vaclav Voves
 Switzerland: René Karlen, Jean Pollet, Raymond Lambercy, Marcel Wuilleumier, Jean Pare, Mottier, Radle, Sidler
 Bulgaria''': Nikola Rogatchev, Etropolski, Krum Konstantinov, Pinkas,

References
Journal de Genève:
2 May 1935 Page 7
3 May 1935 Page 5
4 May 1935 Page 7
5 May 1935 Page 9
6 May 1935 Page 3

External links
FIBA Europe EuroBasket 1935
FIBA Europe article on 1930's EuroBaskets
Eurobasket.com 1935 EChampionship

1935
1935 in basketball
International basketball competitions hosted by Switzerland
1935 in Swiss sport
Sports competitions in Geneva
May 1935 sports events
20th century in Geneva